Juan Manuel Ortiz may refer to:
Juanma Ortiz (footballer, born 1982), Spanish football midfielder
Juan Manuel Ortiz (Uruguayan footballer) (born 1982), Uruguayan football forward
Juanma Ortiz (footballer, born 1986), Spanish football forward

See also
Juan Ortiz (disambiguation)